Cui Ming'an (Chinese: 崔明安, born 15 November 1994 in Dalian) is a Chinese footballer who currently plays for Dalian Professional as a left-footed midfielder in the Chinese Super League.

Club career
Cui started his professional football career in 2013 when he was promoted to Chinese Super League side Dalian Aerbin (now known as Dalian Professional). On 30 April 2014, Cui made his debut for Dalian Aerbin in the 2014 Chinese Super League against Guizhou Renhe, coming on as a substitute for Zhu Xiaogang in the 59th minute. That would be his only league appearance for the club in a disappointing season that saw the club relegated to the second tier. The following season Cui would be given the chance to establish himself as a regular within the team. The club would also change their name to Dalian Yifang F.C. in December 2015. By the end of the  2017 league season he would be a vital member of the squad that won the division championship and promotion back into the top tier.

Career statistics
Statistics accurate as of match played 31 December 2022.

Honours

Club
Dalian Yifang/ Dalian Professional
China League One: 2017

References

External links
 

1994 births
Living people
Chinese footballers
Footballers from Dalian
Dalian Professional F.C. players
Chinese Super League players
China League One players
Association football midfielders